Manganese deficiency may refer to:

 Manganese deficiency (medicine)
 Manganese deficiency (plant)